Dog's Blood is an extended play by the Canadian post-hardcore band Alexisonfire. The EP was released on October 31, 2010. Dog's Blood is a collection of four experimental songs that are different-sounding from the band's previously released material. It was the band's penultimate release before their break up in 2011.

Writing and recording
Work on the Dog's Blood EP was originally announced in September 2009, shortly after the release of Old Crows/Young Cardinals in July 2009. By this point, the band had developed a small group of songs; one was an instrumental piece written during the sessions of Old Crows/Young Cardinals, and the rest were written while Alexisonfire was on tour. The title track "Dog's Blood" began as a single riff, and later evolved into a full song. Alexisonfire vocalist George Pettit wrote  lyrics that were loosely in the style of Nick Cave. The title track features guest vocals by Olly Mitchell, the former vocalist of Johnny Truant.

The album was recorded and co-produced by Alexisonfire and Jon Drew. Though much of the EP was written by September 2009, the band's busy touring schedule delayed recording of Dog's Blood until mid-late 2010. All of the tracks on Dog's Blood are songs that the band members felt were too different from their other material to be included on a full-length album.

Release
Prior to the EP's release, Alexisonfire debuted the album's titled track live at the 2010 CASBY Awards in Toronto, Ontario, Canada on September 30, 2010, and a recording of the track was posted online. Dog's Blood was released through Dine Alone Records on November 23, 2010, though it was distributed internationally on various dates through different labels and also through online music retailers.    A vinyl edition of the album was pressed and limited to 2,000 copies in three colors, one color available from the band on tours, one available through the band's webstore, and the third sold in record stores.

The artwork was designed by the American artist "Skinner", who was given only the EP's title and the band's name on which to base his design. The artwork was completed prior to the album's recording.

Track listing

Personnel
Alexisonfire
 George Pettit – screams
 Dallas Green – rhythm guitar, singing
 Wade MacNeil – lead guitar, backing vocals
 Chris Steele – bass guitar
 Jordan Hastings – drums, percussion

Additional personnel
 Olly Mitchell - vocals on "Dog's Blood"
 Alexisonfire – production
 Jon Drew – production

Release history

References

External links
Skinner's Official Website

2010 EPs
Alexisonfire albums